Meuro is a village and a former municipality in Wittenberg district in Saxony-Anhalt, Germany. Since 1 July 2009, it is part of the town Bad Schmiedeberg.

Geography and transport 
Meuro lies about 20 km southeast of Lutherstadt Wittenberg and about 5 km northwest of Bad Schmiedeberg on the northern edge of the Düben Heath, putting the community's more southerly areas in the Düben Heath Nature Park. West of the community runs the Federal Highway (Bundesstraße) B 2, which joins Berlin and Wittenberg, and to the north runs the B 187. The community is also crossed by a stream called the Flieth.

Subdivisions
Meuro consists of Ogkeln, Sackwitz, and Scholis.

Sightseeing 

 Meuroer Fieldstone church 
 Dübener Heide

External links
Dübener Heide Nature Park

Former municipalities in Saxony-Anhalt
Bad Schmiedeberg